Nik Borrow is a bird artist, ornithologist and tour leader.

He is co-author and illustrator of the Birds of Western Africa, in the Helm Identification Guides series (first published 2001), featuring over 1300 species and the first guide to cover all 23 West African countries. Birdwatch Magazine described the revised addition as "essential for anyone visiting western Africa".

Publications
 Nik Borrow, Ron Demey (2004). Field guide to the birds of Western Africa. London: Christopher Helm.
 Nigel Redman, Terry Stevenson, John Fanshawe, Nik Borrow, Brian E. Small (2009). Birds of the Horn of Africa: Ethiopia, Eritrea, Djibouti, Somalia, Socotra. London: Christopher Helm.
 Nik Borrow, Ron Demey, Erasmus Henaku Owusu, Yaa Ntiamoa-Baidu (2010). Birds of Ghana.  London: Christopher Helm.
 Nik Borrow, Ron Demey (2011). Birds of Senegal and the Gambia. London: Christopher Helm.

References
 Portfolio: Nik Borrow Birding World Vol. 3 No. 10 pp. 354–356

Living people
Place of birth missing (living people)
British bird artists
Alumni of Wimbledon College of Arts
1956 births